Debina Bonnerjee (born 18 April 1983) is an Indian actress who played Sita in the 2008 television soap opera Ramayan. She acted with Famous Kannada Actor Shiva Rajkumar in Nanjundi. Her first television role was in the Tamil TV serial Mayavi (2005). She also appeared as Mayuri in Chidiya Ghar and in several reality shows. In 2019, she appeared in Colors TV's show Vish: A Poisonous Story.

Personal life 

On 15 February 2011, Bonnerjee married actor Gurmeet Choudhary. On 4 October 2021, they married again. On 3 April 2022, they had their first child, Lianna Choudhary On 11 November 2022, they had their second child, another girl, Divisha Choudhary.

Filmography

Films

Television

See also 

 List of Indian television actresses

References

External links

Indian television actresses
Living people
Indian soap opera actresses
21st-century Indian actresses
1983 births
Actresses from Kolkata
Actresses in Hindi television
Actresses in Hindi cinema
Actresses in Telugu cinema
Indian film actresses
Actresses in Kannada cinema
Actresses in Tamil cinema
Fear Factor: Khatron Ke Khiladi participants